The Singapore men's national basketball team is the national team for Singapore in basketball. It is  managed by the Basketball Association of Singapore (BAS), formerly the Singapore Amateur Basketball Association (SABA).

At the Asian Basketball Championship, the country had its greatest success between 1971 and 1993 when it qualified for 12 straight events.
Since 2001, the team has been one of the contenders at the Southeast Asian Basketball Championship. There, the team has won two bronze medals to date.

In 1956, the team qualified for the Summer Olympics where it finished ahead of Asian rivals South Korea and Thailand.

Recent Developments
On 5 June 2009, a "quiet revolution" took place in Singapore national men's basketball team. The team previously representing Singapore was replaced by young talents of the likes of Wei Jian Hong, Steven Khoo, Desmond Oh and Wei Long Wong, with only two senior players from the old squad retained: Pathman Matialakan and Michael Wong. Most of the national team players now play for the Singapore Slingers, the island's only professional basketball club.

2011 Southeast Asian Games
The Singapore Men's National team left for the 2011 SEA Games having had the best preparation for a major tournament in the past 5 years. On 30 September to 1 October 2011, represented by most of the national team players, the Singapore Slingers was invited for the inaugural Cable Beach Invitational at Broome, Australia, where they played the Perth Wildcats and the Indonesia national basketball team. On 5 October 2011, the National team proceeded to play the Perth Redbacks of the Australian SBL. From 25–31 October 2011, the team competed in the 4th China-Asean Invitational Tournament, of which they finished 3rd overall in the competition.

After disappointing close losses to Malaysia and Indonesia, the team finished 5th at the 2011 Southeast Asian Games.

Performances

Summer Olympics

FIBA Asia Cup

Southeast Asian Championship
2001: 
2005: 4th 
2007: 5th
2009: 4th
2011: 4th
2013: 
2015:

SEA Games
1977: 4th
1979: 
1981: 4th
1983: 4th
1989: 4th
1991: 4th
1995: 5th
2001: 5th
2003: 4th
2011: 5th
2013: 
2015: 
2017: 4th
2019: 5th

Team

Current roster
Roster at the 2019 SEA Games.

Past rosters
Roster for the 2017 SEABA Championship.

Head coaches
 Lee Liak Meng (1978)
 Chan Kwok Hung (1979)
 Chan Wah Kwee  and Ong Koon Huat (1980 to 1986)
 Nic Jorge (1983) - Advisor Coach
 Eddie Ng Hang Kee (1987-1991, 2001-2003)
 Beng Siang Neo (2006, 2009–2013)
 So Kwang Loong (2014)
 Beng Siang Neo (2015)
 Neo Nam Kheng (2016)
 Frank Arsego (2016–2018)
 Hsu Tung Ching (2018–2019)

Kit

Manufacturer
2015: Kappa

See also
 Singapore women's national basketball team
 Singapore national under-19 basketball team
 Singapore national under-17 basketball team
 National Basketball League

References

External links
 Official website
 FIBA profile
 Asia-Basket.com
 Archived records of Singapore team participations

Men's national basketball teams
team
Basketball teams in Singapore
Basketbal
1963 establishments in Singapore